Bennet is an English language surname and, less commonly, a given name. Alternative spellings include Bennett, Benett and Benet.

Bennet is an Anglo-Norman English surname with Norman roots, from the medieval personal name Benedict (from the Latin Benedictus, 'blessed').  In the 12th century, it became a common given name throughout Europe due to the popularity of St Benedict (c. 480 – c. 543). The Latin form of the name was found in England, alongside versions derived from the Old French forms Beneit and Benoit, which was common among the Normans.

People
Notable people with the surname include:
 Abraham Bennet FRS (born 1749) English physicist. 
 Carl Bennet (born 1951), Swedish businessman and billionaire 
 Charles Bennet, 6th Earl of Tankerville, (1810–1899), British peer and politician 
 Chloe Bennet (born 1992), American actress
 Christopher Bennet, (1617–1655), English physician
 Douglas J. Bennet (1938–2018), American diplomat and president of Wesleyan University
 Eduardo Bennet (born 1968), Honduran soccer player
 Ferdinando Bennet (1850–1929), English soldier and cricketer
 Henry Bennet, 1st Earl of Arlington, (1618–1685), English statesman
 Isabella Bennet, 2nd Countess of Arlington (c. 1668–1723), British peer and heiress
 James Bennet, a number of individuals with the name
 James Bennet (clergyman) (1817—1901), Irish Presbyterian clergyman, writer and author
 James Bennet (journalist), American newspaper and magazine editor
 James Bennet (politician) (1830–1908), Liberal Party Member of Parliament in New Zealand
 John Bennet, a number of individuals with the name 
 John Bennet of the Bennet baronets
 John Bennet (composer) (c. 1575–after 1614), English composer
 John Bennet (judge) (1552/3–1627),  English judge and MP accused of corruption
 John Bennet (preacher) (1714–1759), English Methodist preacher
 John Bennet (MP) (1628–1663), English landowner and politician
 John Bennet, 1st Baron Ossulston (1616–1695), English statesman
 John Bennet (archaeologist) (born 1951), British archaeologist and Professor of Aegean Archaeology at Sheffield University
 Keane Grace Wallis Bennet (died 2014), a British girl who died in an accident
 Michael Bennet (born 1964), United States politician, Senator from Colorado 
Naftali Bennett Prime minister of Israel 2021-2022
 Spencer Gordon Bennet (1893–1987), American film producer and director
 Thomas Bennet, a number of individuals with the name
 Thomas Bennet (clergyman), English clergyman
 Thomas Bennet (academic), British academic and administrator, Master of University College, Oxford
 William Bennet, a number of individuals with the name 
 William Bennet (MP for Ripon) (died 1609), MP for Ripon
 William Bennet (bishop) (1746–1820), Bishop of Cloyne and antiquary
 William Bennet (musician) (1767?–1833?), English musician
 William Stiles Bennet (1870–1962), American politician
 William S. Bennet II (1934–2009), American business executive
 William Bennet (engineer) (active 1790–1826), English canal engineer (also spelled Bennett)
 Sir William Bennet, 1st Baronet (died 1710) of the Bennet baronets
 Sir William Bennet, 2nd Baronet (died 1729), member of 1st Parliament of Great Britain
 Sir William Bennet, 3rd Baronet (died 1733) of the Bennet baronets

Fictional characters
Fictional characters with the surname include:

 The Bennet family in Jane Austen's Pride and Prejudice
 Mr. Bennet (Pride and Prejudice)
 Mrs. Bennet
 Elizabeth Bennet, daughter of the above
 The Bennet family in the Heroes TV series:
 Claire Bennet, cheerleader character 
 Noah Bennet, adoptive father of Claire, known as "Horn-Rimmed Glasses"
 Sandra Bennet, Noah's wife and Claire's adoptive mother
 Lyle Bennet, son of Noah and Sandra
 Bennet from the 1985 action film Commando
 Vice President Kathryn Bennet, a character from the 1997 action film Air Force One

See also
 Saint Benedict of Nursia, patron saint of Europe, and twin brother of Saint Scholastica

References